Tekumatla is a village and mandal in Jayashankar Bhupalpally district of the Indian state of Telangana.

References

Mandals in Jayashankar Bhupalpally district
Villages in Jayashankar Bhupalpally district